A train crash occurred on September 2, 1954 near Fabrica, Negros Occidental, Philippines when a timber train carrying more than 100 passengers derailed and multiple wagons fell off a bridge. At least 82 people were killed.

References 
 82 Killed In Runaway Mountain-train Crash. The Sydney Morning Herald. September 4, 1954. p. 1.

Railway accidents in 1954
Derailments in the Philippines
History of Negros Occidental
September 1954 events in Asia